Magaruque Island, formerly Ilha Santa Isabel, is part of the Bazaruto Archipelago, off the coast of Mozambique. It is located 5.6 km south of Benguerra Island, and 9.9 km east of Ponta Chuè on the mainland of Mozambique.

The island is 2.4 km long north-south, and up to 1.0 km wide. Its area is less than 2 km².

Bazaruto Archipelago
Islands of Mozambique
Private islands of Africa